Gogol Bordello is an American punk rock band from the Lower East Side of Manhattan, formed in 1999 by musicians from all over the world and known for theatrical stage shows and persistent touring. Much of the band's sound is inspired by Romani music mixed with punk and dub, incorporating accordion and violin (and on some albums, saxophone).

The band has appeared in several popular films, most notably Everything Is Illuminated (2005) in which lead singer Eugene Hütz co-starred with Elijah Wood in a dramedy/adventure story about the Nazi purges in Ukraine. The group appears playing a brass band in a set that included the "Star-Spangled Banner" and the traditional Yiddish song "Bublitschki". Gogol Bordello contributed the song "Start Wearing Purple" to the film's score. The band is the focus of the 2008 documentary Gogol Bordello Non-Stop. The band recorded the song "Let's Get Crazy" for Coca-Cola's Euro 2012 advertising campaign.

History and influences
"Gogol" comes from Nikolai Gogol, a classical writer of Ukrainian origin. He serves as an ideological influence for the band because he "smuggled" Ukrainian culture into Russian society, which Gogol Bordello intends to do with Romani/East-European music in the English-speaking world. "Bordello", in Italian, refers to a brothel or a "gentleman's club". The band was originally titled Hütz and the Béla Bartóks, but Eugene Hütz says that they decided to change the name because "nobody knows who the hell Béla Bartók is in the United States." The band played their first show as the unofficial band at an after-hours club called Pizdetz where they became the house band and DJ Hütz became the house DJ.

Gogol Bordello's first single was released in 1999, and since then they have released six full-length albums, and one EP. In 2005 the band signed to punk label SideOneDummy Records. On 27 April 2010 Gogol Bordello made its major record label debut with Transcontinental Hustle on Rick Rubin's American Recordings, a subsidiary of Columbia Records/Sony Music Entertainment. Many of the songs on Transcontinental Hustle were inspired by Hütz's move to Brazil.

The band has toured extensively throughout Europe and America. They have made numerous appearances at international festivals and have toured with such diverse bands as Primus, Flogging Molly, and Cake. In an interview with NPR, frontman Eugene Hütz cites Jimi Hendrix and Parliament-Funkadelic as among the band's main musical influences. They have also mentioned Manu Chao, Fugazi, Zvuki Mu, Karamelo Santo, Sasha Kolpakov and The Clash as influences.

They performed live at the Bonnaroo Music and Arts festival 2011 for Bonnaroo's 10 year anniversary, playing a 1.5 hour set in the middle of the night and performed with Devotchka.

Gogol Bordello released "Let's Get Crazy" in 2012, the new song was part of Coca-Cola's advertising campaign for the European Football Championships, which were part-hosted by Ukraine. The track samples one of their earlier singles, "Wonderlust King", and the Coca-Cola advertising jingle.

In 2012 former guitarist Oren Kaplan sued Hütz for personal damages.

The 2010 song "Immigraniada" was remixed by Bassnectar becoming a smash hit amongst his fans hoping for a live performance anytime the band and he are in proximity to each other.

Following the 2022 Russian invasion of Ukraine, Hütz released a video on social media condemning the Russian invasion, and has remained vocal about raising relief funds for the victims of the invasion.  Gogol Bordello announced a benefit concert shortly after which sold out quickly, followed by announcing a benefit tour. Bordello collaborated with Les Claypool of the funk band Primus on the song "Man with the Iron Balls", praising Ukrainian President Volodymyr Zelensky's courage. The proceeds of the track are set to benefit Nova Ukraine, a non-profit organization that provides humanitarian relief to the people of Ukraine.

Film appearances
 2004 – Kill Your Idols – Hütz was interviewed in this documentary about New York's "art punk" music scene.
 2005 – Everything Is Illuminated – In Liev Schreiber's directorial debut, which stars Elijah Wood, the role of Alexander Perchov was played by Eugene Hütz. It includes cameo appearances by other Gogol Bordello members in the train scene.
 2006 – The Pied Piper of Hützovina – Documentary by Pavla Fleischer about a road trip she and Eugene Hütz took to Ukraine to trace his roots.
 2006 – Wristcutters: A Love Story – "Eugene", played by American actor Shea Whigham, is partly based on Eugene Hütz, whose music ("Through the Roof and Underground", "Occurrence on the Border", and "Huliganjetta") is featured in the film as that recorded by the character's old band. Contrary to the belief that he has received no credit for this, the film credits show the copyrights for both Gogol Bordello songs, as well as giving thanks to Eugene multiple times throughout the credit roll.
 2008 – Filth and Wisdom – The entire band appeared in this independent film directed by Madonna. Eugene Hütz is the protagonist. Madonna also allowed Eugene to add his own dialogue into the script.
 2008 – Gogol Bordello Non-Stop – The development of the band was documented in this film directed by Margarita Jimeno. It follows the band's rise from underground legends to international fame from 2001 to 2007.
 2009 – Larger Than Life in 3D – Live High-def digital concert footage shot in stereoscopic 3-D at the Austin City Limits festival in October 2009.
 2009 – Live From Axis Mundi: Professionally recorded live concert footage shot in New York.
 2011 – Grain: Short film, 'Against the Nature' appears on the credits.
 2017 – "American Wedding" Fargo Season 3 Episode 2 "The Principle of Restricted Choice" closing credits
 2017 - "Risky Bismuth" The Tick Season 1 Episode 10 "Trans Continental Hustle" closing credits
 2018- “I Would Never Wanna Be Young Again” into plays during monster wedding scene in “Hotel Transylvania 3”

Members 

 Current members

 Eugene Hütz (lead vocals, acoustic guitar, percussion) – Ukraine (1999–present)
 Sergey Ryabtsev (violin, backing vocals) – Russia (2000–present)
 Pedro Erazo (percussion, MC) – Ecuador (2007–present)
 Boris Pelekh (guitar,  backing vocals) – Russia (2015–present)
 Vanessa Walters (percussion, backing vocals, general performance) (2016–present)
 Ashley Tobias "TOBI" (backing vocals, dance, percussion, general performance) – United States (2017–present)
 Korey Kingston (Drums, percussion) (2020-present)
 Gill Alexandre (Bass, backing vocals) (2021-present)

 Former members
 Pamela Jintana Racine (percussion, backing vocals, dance, general performance) – United States (1999-2017)
 Eliot Ferguson (drums, backing vocals) – United States (1999-2009)
 Sasha Kazatchkoff (accordion) (1999)
 Vlad Solovar (guitar) (1999)
 Oren Kaplan (guitar, backing vocals) – Israel (2000–2012)
 Yuri Lemeshev (accordion, backing vocals) – Russia (2001–2013)
 Ori Kaplan (saxophone, backing vocals) – Israel (no relation to Oren Kaplan, co-leads Balkan Beat Box with Tamir Muskat) (2001-2004)
 Katheryn McGaffigan (percussion, backing vocals, dance, general performance) – United States (2002)
 Susan Donaldson (percussion, backing vocals, dance, general performance) (2002-2003)
 Andra Ursuta (percussion, backing vocals, dance, general performance) – Romania (2003-2006)
 Chris Tattersall (drums, backing vocals) – United Kingdom (2004)
 Elizabeth Sun (percussion, backing vocals, dance, general performance) – China and Scotland (2004–2016)
 Rea Mochiach (bass, percussion, electronics and beat programming in the studio, backing vocals) – Israel (2005)
 Karl Alvarez (bass) – United States (2006)
 Oliver Charles (drums) – United States (2009-2016)
 Michael Ward (guitar) – United States (2011–15)
 Pasha Newmer (accordion; backing vocals) – Belarus (2013–2018)
 James Ward (accordion) – Scotland
 Kristian Mangieri (harmonica, general performance)
 Thomas ‘Tommy T’ Gobena (Bass, backing vocals) (2006-2021)
Alfredo Ortiz (Drums) (2016-2020)

Timeline

Discography

Albums
 Voi-La Intruder (1999)
 Multi Kontra Culti vs. Irony (2002)
 Gypsy Punks: Underdog World Strike (2005)
 Super Taranta! (2007)
 Trans-Continental Hustle (2010)
 Моя Цыганиада (2011)
 Pura Vida Conspiracy (2013)
 Seekers and Finders (2017)
 Solidaritine (2022)

EPs
 East Infection (2005)

Compilations
 Punk Rock Strike Vol. 4 (2003)
 2005 Warped Tour Compilation (2005)
 2006 Warped Tour Compilation (2006)
 Gypsy Beats and Balkan Bangers (2006)
 The Rough Guide to Planet Rock (2006)
 2007 Warped Tour Compilation (2007)

Notes

References

External links

 
 [ AllMusic Entry]
 Interview at NPR's Studio 4A (2006) with several songs performed

 
Musical groups from New York City
Gypsy punk groups
1999 establishments in New York City
ATO Records artists
Cooking Vinyl artists
American Recordings (record label) artists